Robert Arondeaux (abbreviated as R. A. on some of his works) was a sculptor and medallist who was employed by both William III and Louis XIV. Both his date of birth and date of death are unknown. He was probably Flemish.

Works
Arondeaux was very prolific in his work, designing over twenty medals during the period 1678 to 1702.

References

17th-century sculptors
Flemish sculptors (before 1830)
Medallists